Lieutenant-General Sir Hugh Patrick Cunningham  (4 November 1921 – 12 September 2019) was a British Army officer who became Deputy Chief of the Defence Staff (Operational Requirements).

Military career
Educated at Charterhouse School, Cunningham was commissioned into the Royal Engineers in 1942 and fought in World War II in India, New Guinea and Burma. He was appointed Commander Royal Engineers for 3rd Division in Cyprus and Aden in 1963, Commander of 11th Engineering Brigade in Germany in 1967 and General Officer Commanding South West District in 1971. He went on to be Assistant Chief of the General Staff (Operational Requirements) in 1974 and Deputy Chief of the Defence Staff (Operational Requirements) in 1976 before retiring in 1978.

In retirement he became a Director of Fairey Engineering. He lived at Shaftesbury in Dorset. He was one of the three Presidents of the UK-based charity Action on Addiction.

He died on 12 September 2019 at the age of 97.

References

 

|-

|-

1921 births
2019 deaths
British Army lieutenant generals
Royal Engineers officers
Knights Commander of the Order of the British Empire
People educated at Charterhouse School
British Army personnel of World War II